The 1915–16 Cornell Big Red men's ice hockey season was the 15th season of play for the program.

Season
The warm weather that had been affecting upstate New York for the past few years caused the athletic department at Cornell to finally surrender. With the team only able to schedule two away games for the entire season, the ice hockey program was shuttered until the team could have local ice to practice on. The onset of World War I caused a delay in the return of the team until 1920.

Roster

Standings

Schedule and Results

|-
!colspan=12 style=";" | Regular Season

References

Cornell Big Red men's ice hockey seasons
Cornell
Cornell
Cornell
Cornell